Richard Kang-in Kam (born December 24, 1996) is a New Zealand and South Korean ice dancer who currently competes with Charlotte Lafond-Fournier representing New Zealand.

Competing for South Korea with his former skating partner, Lee Ho-jung, he is a two-time national medalist and competed in the free dance at four ISU Championships.

Early life
On December 24, 1996, Kam was born in Christchurch, New Zealand. He is the younger brother of Korean figure skater Alex Kang-chan Kam.

Career
Kam began skating in 2005. He competed as a singles skater until the 2013–2014 season.

Ice dancing
In the 2014–15 season, Kam began competing in ice dancing with Lee Ho-jung. At the 2015 World Junior Championships in Tallinn, Estonia, they qualified to the final segment by placing twentieth in the short dance and went on to finish nineteenth overall.

Lee/Kam made their senior international debut in February 2016 at the Four Continents Championships in Taipei, Taiwan, where they finished tenth. In March, they placed fourteenth at the 2016 World Junior Championships in Debrecen, Hungary.

In their final season together, Lee/Kam won the silver medal at the South Korean championships and finished thirteenth at the 2017 Four Continents Championships. Lee Ho-jung announced on April 3, 2017, that their partnership has been dissolved.

After some years away from competition, Kam formed a new partnership with Canadian ice dancer Charlotte Lafond-Fournier, this time representing New Zealand. They made their Challenger series debut at the 2021 CS Autumn Classic International, where they finished in seventh.  Lafond-Fournier/Kam next competed at the 2021 CS Nebelhorn Trophy, seeking to qualify a berth for a New Zealand dance team at the 2022 Winter Olympics, but finished in twelfth position, outside of qualification. Lafond-Fournier/Kam were ninth at the 2022 Four Continents Championships and twenty-fourth in their inaugural appearance at the World Championships.

Programs

Ice dancing with Lafond-Fournier

Ice dancing with Lee

Single skating

Competitive highlights

With Lafond-Fournier for New Zealand

With Lee for South Korea

Single skating for South Korea

References

External links
 
 

1996 births
Living people
Figure skaters from Seoul
Sportspeople from Christchurch
South Korean male ice dancers
South Korean male single skaters
New Zealand people of South Korean descent
New Zealand emigrants to South Korea
Figure skaters at the 2017 Asian Winter Games